The Taşlıca Detachment of the Ottoman Empire (Turkish: Taşlıca Müfrezesi) was one of the Detachment under the command of the Ottoman Vardar Army of the Western Army. It was formed in Taşlıca (present day: Pljevlja) area for the defense of the Sanjack of Yenipazar during the First Balkan War.

Balkan Wars

Order of Battle, October 19, 1912 
On October 19, 1912, the detachment was structured as follows:

Taşlıca Detachment HQ (Serbian Front, under the command of the Vardar Army of the Western Army)
60th Infantry Regiment
Taşlıca Redif Division

Sources

Detachment of the Ottoman Empire
Military units and formations of the Ottoman Empire in the Balkan Wars
Ottoman period in the history of Montenegro